Krister Wedenby (born 13 December 1971) is a former professional tennis player from Sweden.

Tennis career
Wedenby competed professionally during the early 1990s, winning one doubles title on the ATP Challenger Tour, when he and partner Wojciech Kowalski were victorious at the tournament in Vienna. His only ATP Tour main draw appearance came in singles, at the 1990 Stockholm Open, where he lost to David Wheaton in the first round.

On the ITF Satellite circuit, he won the singles title at the France 3 Circuit, in 1992. Wedenby reached a career high singles ranking of 260 and a best doubles ranking of 336 in the world.

Challenger titles

Doubles: (1)

References

External links
 
 

1971 births
Living people
Swedish male tennis players
People from Jönköping
Sportspeople from Jönköping County